Blue Moon is the debut studio album by Swedish folk musician Sofia Talvik. Released in 2005, the album took 40 hours to record, and received mostly positive reviews.

Track listing

References

External links
 Blue Moon by Sofia Talvik on Bandcamp

2005 albums
Sofia Talvik albums